Stenoglene giganteus is a moth in the family Eupterotidae. It was described by Rothschild in 1917. It is found in Sierra Leone.

The wingspan is about 85 mm. The forewings are purplish cinnamon-chocolate with a postmedian whitish-pink transverse band. The hindwings are paler.

References

Moths described in 1917
Janinae